The 1975–76  Gonzaga Bulldogs men's basketball team represented Gonzaga University during the 1975–76 NCAA Division I basketball season. Members of the Big Sky Conference, the Bulldogs were led by fourth-year head coach Adrian Buoncristiani and played their home games on campus at Kennedy Pavilion in Spokane, Washington.

No Bulldogs were selected for the all-conference team; junior center Jim Grady was on the second team.

The conference tournament debuted this season; through 1983, it was hosted by the regular season champion and only the top four teams participated. Gonzaga made it sole appearance the following year.

References

External links
Sports Reference – Gonzaga Bulldogs: 1975–76 basketball season

Gonzaga Bulldogs men's basketball seasons
Gonzaga